Çolakpehlivan  is a village in Devrek District, Zonguldak Province, Turkey.

References

Villages in Devrek District